Todd Woodbridge and Mark Woodforde were the defending champions, but lost in the quarterfinals to Olivier Delaître and Fabrice Santoro.

Mark Knowles and Daniel Nestor won the title, by defeating Delaitre and Santoro, 6–1, 2–1 (ret) in the finals.

Seeds
Champion seeds are indicated in bold text while text in italics indicates the round in which those seeds were eliminated.

Draw

Finals

Top half

Bottom half

References

Doubles